Mesoropi is a village in the south-eastern part of the regional unit of Kavala in northern Greece.

Geography
The village belongs to the municipality of Pangaio and the municipal unit of Piereis. It is situated 350 meters above sea level at 35 km west of the town of Kavala. The River Nidrios passes through the village.

References

External links
Mesoropi location coordinates
 http://www.who-is-who.gr/page.asp?id=29806 

Populated places in Kavala (regional unit)